also known as Aki, is a Japanese singer, as a solo artist and former member of the Japanese idol J-pop group SKE48.

Career
Deguchi participated in AKB48's First AKK Kenky Audience (Force 4), which included 18 people who were accepted as training students on May 27, 2007.Shizuka Ōya, Amina Sato and Reina Fujie were among her contemporaries at AKB48.

At the Sunflower 1st Stage theater show "Boku no Taiyou", November 26, 2007, she announced her departure from AKB48 on the grounds of wanting to continue her studies. But she did not retire from singing. Deguchi re-auditioned, this time for SKE48. She was among the 22 people who passed the audition on July 31, 2008. Deguchi was selected as one of the 16 members of the Senbatsu for the first SKE48 theater performance of Team S 1st Stage "Party ga Hajimaru yo". She took to the stage of the SKE48 Theater for the first time on October 5, 2008. When Team S was formed in March 2009, its members came from 16 members of the theatrical performances senbatsu, including Deguchi.

The television drama series Paranoid detective! starring SKE48 members was her first acting experience. Her role as one of the detectives together with Jurina Matsui, Rikako Hirata, and Haruka Ono. The television drama aired January 12, 2011 to March 30, 2011 on Tokai Television Broadcasting.

She is no longer elected as a senbatsu member since the inaugural single Tsuyoki Mono yo involving all members of SKE48.

In 2014, left SKE48.

In 2015, released her first solo single "FLASHBACK."

Discography

References

External links
 
 Official blog at Ameblo
 
 Official page at SKE48 
 Official blog at SKE48 

1988 births
Living people
People from Matsusaka, Mie
SKE48 members
AKB48 members
21st-century Japanese women singers
21st-century Japanese singers